Karalina Savenka (born 21 April 1998) is a Belarusian professional racing cyclist, who currently rides for UCI Women's Continental Team .

References

External links

1998 births
Living people
Belarusian female cyclists
Place of birth missing (living people)
Cyclists at the 2019 European Games
European Games competitors for Belarus